Tom O'Hare (born 1943 in Mayobridge, County Down) is a former Irish sportsperson. He played Gaelic football with his local clubs Mayobridge and Clonduff and was a member of the Down senior inter-county team from the 1960s until the 1970s. O'Hare won an All-Ireland winners' medal with Down in 1968, scoring two points from 45s. O'Hare was recognised as one of the best defenders ever to play the game. He is currently a trustee and president of his club Mayobridge.  O'Hare was named on Mícheál Ó Muircheartaigh's team of his life, which was published in the Sunday Independent.

References

 

1942 births
Living people
Clonduff Gaelic footballers
Down inter-county Gaelic footballers
Gaelic games club administrators
Mayobridge Gaelic footballers
People from Mayobridge
Ulster inter-provincial Gaelic footballers